James Bogardus (March 14, 1800 – April 13, 1874) was an American inventor and architect, the pioneer of American cast-iron architecture, for which he took out a patent in 1850.

Early life
Bogardus was born in the town of Catskill in New York on March 14, 1800.  He was a descendant of the Rev. Everardus Bogardus (d. 1647), the second clergyman in [[New york
]].

At the age of fourteen, Bogardus quit school to start an apprenticeship at a watchmaker.

Career
In 1828, Bogardus invented a cotton-spinning machine called a ring flier. In 1831, he invented a mechanized engraving machine that was employed for engraving dies for bank notes.  He also invented the eccentric mill in 1832, which is still used in principle for fine finish of ball bearings, and, with variable eccentricity, for lens grinding.

Bogardus attached plaques to his cast-ironwork that read: "James Bogardus Originator & Patentee of Iron Buildings Pat' May 7, 1850."  He demonstrated the use of cast-iron in the construction of building facades, especially in New York City for the next two decades.  He was based in New York, but also worked in Washington, DC, where three cast-iron structures erected by Bogardus in 1851 were the first such constructions in the capital. The success of the cast-iron exteriors from 1850 to 1880 led to the adoption of steel-frame construction for entire buildings.

Personal life

He married Margaret MacClay (1803–1878), the daughter of Daughter of Rev. Archibald Maclay, in 1831. Margaret worked as an artist and two portrait miniatures by her are in the collection of the Metropolitan Museum of Art.

Bogardus died in New York City aged 74. Bogardus is interred at Green-Wood Cemetery in Brooklyn, New York.

Legacy
A small park in TriBeCa, where Chambers Street, Hudson Street and West Broadway intersect, is named James Bogardus Triangle.

Bogardus buildings
 63 Nassau Street
 254 Canal Street
 75 Murray Street
 85 Leonard Street
 Iron Clad Building, Cooperstown, New York (92 Main St, Cooperstown, NY)

Further reading
Margot Gayle and Carol Gayle. Cast-Iron Architecture in America: The Significance of James Bogardus (New York: Norton) 1998.

References

1800 births
1874 deaths
Burials at Green-Wood Cemetery
Architects from New York (state)
19th-century American inventors
People from the Catskills
Cast-iron architecture
19th-century American architects
People from Catskill, New York